A Night at the Puppet House is a live recording of Gandalf Murphy and the Slambovian Circus of Dreams' November 13, 2004 show at the Puppet House Theatre in Stony Creek, Connecticut.

This is a two-disc album which contains the full show, both songs and introductions.

Track listing

Disc one
"Sunday in the Rain" – 6:12
"Circus of Dreams" – 5:38
"Everyone Has a Broken Heart" – 6:26
"The Yodel Song" – 6:57
"I Wish" – 3:20
"Look Ma No Hands" – 4:46
"Glide" – 5:54
"Moondog House" – 3:41

Disc two
"Gonna Get Up" – 3:17
"Rocket" – 6:20
"Sullivan Lane" – 5:49
"Bike" – 7:09
"Never Fit" – 7:03
"In Her Own World" – 4:52
"Talkin' to the Buddha" – 10:46
"Alice in Space" – 6:19
"Alligators" – 7:41

See also
 

Gandalf Murphy and the Slambovian Circus of Dreams albums
2004 live albums